The United States Air Force's 4505th Air Refueling Wing (Tactical) was an Air Refueling unit located at Langley AFB, Virginia. It was established on 1 Jul 1958 at Langley AFB, Virginia. The 4505th was the only aerial refueling wing in the Tactical Air Command structure. The wing flew the KB-50J, a derivative of the B-50 nuclear bomber. The 4505th Air Refueling Wing (Tactical) was discontinued on 8 Oct 1963.

Assignments

Major command
Tactical Air Command (1 Jul 1958 – 8 Oct 1963)

Numbered Air Force
 (1 Jul 58 – 8 Oct 63)

Air division
 (1 Jul 58 – 8 Oct 63)

Previous designations
4505th Air Refueling Wing, Tactical (1 Jul 1958 – 8 Oct 1963)

Units
 4440th Aircraft Delivery Group, 1 July 1961 – 8 October 1963
427th Air Refueling Squadron – Robins AFB, Georgia (1 Jul 1958 – 8 Oct 1963)
429th Air Refueling Squadron – Langley AFB, Virginia (1 Jul 1958 – 8 Oct 1963)
431st Air Refueling Squadron – Turner AFB, Georgia (1 Jul 1958 – 8 Oct 1963)
622d Air Refueling Squadron – England AFB, Louisiana (1 Jul 1958 – 8 Oct 1963)

References

4505th CAMS Langley AFB

External links
 TACTankers.com – 4505th Page

Four Digit Wings of the United States Air Force
Air refueling wings of the United States Air Force
Military units and formations established in 1958
Military units and formations disestablished in 1963
1958 establishments in Virginia
1963 disestablishments in Virginia